is a Japanese footballer who plays for Fujieda MYFC.

Club statistics
Updated to 23 February 2018.

References

External links

Profile at Machida Zelvia
Profile at Fujieda MYFC

1991 births
Living people
Ritsumeikan University alumni
Association football people from Shiga Prefecture
Blaublitz Akita players
Japanese footballers
J3 League players
FC Machida Zelvia players
Iwate Grulla Morioka players
Fujieda MYFC players
Association football midfielders